The list of Kappa Kappa Gamma sisters (commonly referred to as Kappas) includes initiated and honorary members of Kappa Kappa Gamma.

Notable alumnae

Business

Entertainment

Literature

Media

Politics and public service

Science and education

Sports

References

External links
Kappa Kappa Gamma
Kappa Kappa Gamma - Notable Kappas

Lists of members of United States student societies
sisters